The Edward R. Madigan State Fish and Wildlife Area is a  conservation area located in the U.S. state of Illinois.  It is located south of Lincoln, Illinois. Founded in 1971 as Railsplitter State Park, it was renamed in 1995 in honor of Edward R. Madigan, a former member of the U.S. House of Representatives from the town of Lincoln and a U.S. Secretary of Agriculture.  The park is operated by the Illinois Department of Natural Resources (IDNR).

The horseshoe-shaped park surrounds the Lincoln Correctional Center/Logan Correctional Center, a complex of state facilities operated by the Illinois Department of Corrections.  One of the park's primary assets is a  section of Salt Creek, a major tributary of central Illinois' Sangamon River.

Park resources

Birds
Edward R. Madigan is a principal pheasant hatchery for IDNR, producing 80,000 to 100,000 hatchlings annually.  Upland birds hunted at Madigan include pheasants, doves, and quail.

Fish
DNR stated in 2006 that Salt Creek contained largemouth bass, smallmouth bass, bluegill, sunfish, crappie, drum, channel catfish, bullhead, and carp.  The bluegill is the state fish of Illinois.  Drum has also been caught here. Canoeing. and kayaking in Salt Creek are allowed during the daytime.

Trees
Trails totaling  wind through wooded areas.  The Madigan Salt Creek bottomlands contain one of Illinois's largest American sycamore trees.  Outside the creek bed, the conservation area contains several groves of white oak and hickory, typical of central Illinois.  The white oak is the state tree of Illinois.  The state park also contains ash, hackberry, and black walnut trees.  A herd of 100-150 deer graze the trees and brush.

Access and historic road
Old U.S. Highway 66, now Interstate Business 55, passes through the Madigan State Fish and Wildlife Area.

The nearest limited-access exit to the Madigan State Fish and Wildlife Area is exit 123 on Interstate 55, where Business 55 intersects with Interstate 55.

External links
 Edward R. Madigan State Fish and Wildlife Area

References
Joe McFarland, "Lincoln's Outdoors", Outdoor Illinois (magazine), March 2007, pages 10–13.

State parks of Illinois
Protected areas of Logan County, Illinois
Protected areas established in 1971
1971 establishments in Illinois